The 2013 Indonesia Super Series Premier was the fifth super series tournament of the 2013 BWF Super Series. The tournament was held in Jakarta, Indonesia on 10 to 16 June 2013 and had a total purse of $700,000. A qualification was held to fill four places in all five disciplines of the main draws.

Men's singles

Seeds

 Lee Chong Wei (champions)
 Chen Long (first round)
 Du Pengyu (quarterfinals)
 Sony Dwi Kuncoro (second round)
 Kenichi Tago (first round)
 Hu Yun (first round)
 Jan Ø. Jørgensen (first round)
 Boonsak Ponsana (quarterfinals)

Top half

Bottom half

Finals

Women's singles

Seeds

 Li Xuerui (champions)
 Saina Nehwal (semifinals)
 Wang Yihan (first round)
 Juliane Schenk (final)
 Ratchanok Intanon (withdrew)
 Sung Ji-hyun (first round)
 Wang Shixian (first round)
 Tai Tzu-ying (quarterfinals)

Top half

Bottom half

Finals

Men's doubles

Seeds

 Mathias Boe / Carsten Mogensen (first round)
 Ko Sung-hyun / Lee Yong-dae (final)
 Koo Kien Keat / Tan Boon Heong (second round)
 Hiroyuki Endo / Kenichi Hayakawa (first round)
 Cai Yun / Fu Haifeng (quarterfinals)
 Kim Ki-jung / Kim Sa-rang (first round)
 Liu Xiaolong / Qiu Zihan (second round)
 Shin Baek-cheol / Yoo Yeon-seong (semifinals)

Top half

Bottom half

Finals

Women's doubles

Seeds

 Wang Xiaoli / Yu Yang (final)
 Misaki Matsutomo / Ayaka Takahashi (quarterfinals)
 Christinna Pedersen / Kamilla Rytter Juhl (first round)
 Ma Jin / Tang Jinhua (semifinals)
 Tian Qing / Zhao Yunlei (semifinals)
 Duanganong Aroonkesorn / Kunchala Voravichitchaikul (first round)
 Pia Zebadiah Bernadeth / Rizki Amelia Pradipta (quarterfinals)
 Bao Yixin / Cheng Shu (champions)

Top half

Bottom half

Finals

Mixed doubles

Seeds

 Xu Chen / Ma Jin (semifinals)
 Tantowi Ahmad / Lilyana Natsir (semifinals)
 Zhang Nan / Zhao Yunlei (champions)
 Joachim Fischer Nielsen / Christinna Pedersen (final)
 Chan Peng Soon / Goh Liu Ying (quarterfinals)
 Sudket Prapakamol / Saralee Thoungthongkam (withdrew)
 Robert Mateusiak / Nadiezda Zieba (quarterfinals)
 Muhammad Rijal / Debby Susanto (quarterfinals)

Top half

Bottom half

Finals

References 

Indonesia Super Series Premier
2013 Indonesia Super Series
Indonesia Super Series